was one of 18   escort destroyers built for the Imperial Japanese Navy during World War II.

Bibliography

 

 
 

Matsu-class destroyers
Ships built by Fujinagata Shipyards
World War II destroyers of Japan
1944 ships